NunatuKavut is an unrecognized Inuit territory in Labrador. The NunatuKavut people (previously called Inuit-Metis or Labrador Metis) are the direct descendants of the Inuit that lived south of the Churchill or Grand River prior to European contact, with recent European admixture primarily from English settlers. According to recent censuses completed by Statistics Canada, the majority of individuals living in NunatuKavut communities identify as Inuit-Métis as opposed to 'Inuit'.

NunatuKavut  means "Our ancient land" in the ancestral Inuttitut dialect of central and southern Labrador Inuit.  The region claimed by NunatuKavut generally encompasses Southern Labrador, from the Grand River south to Lodge Bay and west to the extent of the official border between Quebec and Labrador. However, the land use area is much more extensive.

History

Early European contact
The area was known as Markland in Greenlandic Norse and its inhabitants were known as the Skræling.

In 1652, an Inuit community was recorded in what is now the Côte-Nord region of Quebec. In 1659, Jacques Fremin described an Inuit community at Cape St. Charles. Louis Fornel named the area from Alexis Bay to Hamilton Inlet the "Coste des Eskimaux" in 1743 and claimed there was Inuit living around St. Michael's Bay ("Baye des Meniques"), Hawke Bay, Martin Bay and Hamilton Inlet.

Post-1763: Creation of Labrador and European contact

In 1763 Labrador was ceded to the Colony of Newfoundland. It included coastal area between the St. John's River and Cape Chidley and was meant as extra fishing grounds for Newfoundland fishermen. Labrador has been created using territory from the French colony of New France and the British colony of Rupert's Land. The inland boundary of Labrador was undefined until 1927 so Canada claimed the interior of Labrador as part of Quebec and the Northwest Territories while Newfoundland claimed that Labrador extended far inland. Labrador was ceded back to New France (now Lower Canada) and Rupert's Land in 1791 but then in 1809 it rejoined Newfoundland. In 1825 Blanc-Sablon and territory to the west was ceded to Lower Canada however this region (Le Golfe-du-Saint-Laurent Regional County Municipality) remains culturally close to NunatuKavut.

In 1764, Jens Haven arrived at Quirpon, Newfoundland and to Chateau Bay. He was a missionary from the Moravian Church. Haven learned the Inuit language and explained to them that the Colony of Newfoundland wished to enter a peaceful relationship with them. Haven had previously worked in Greenland which is where he learnt the Greenlandic language (which is a similar language to the Inuttitut language spoken by Labradorian Inuit).

In 1765, Governor Sir Hugh Palliser signed the "Labrador Treaty" with Inuit leaders at Chateau Bay. The British would protect Labrador from French and American influence while the Inuit would have the right to self-government, harvest of wildlife and natural resources. The Inuit had sided with the British during the Seven Years' War and fought a battle against the French and Innu at Battle Harbour. The Inuit had previously had a poor relationship with the French. In 1741, the Inuit revolted against the French at Cape St. Charles. The Inuit were also known to attack Basque fishermen around the Strait of Belle Isle. The 1765 treaty ensured a peaceful relationship between the Inuit and the fishermen from England and Newfoundland.

The Moravian Church set up missionary posts in northern Labrador since the British hoped to colonize the south. They restricted access by Europeans to territory between Cape Chidley and Cape Harrison which created a cultural divide between the Inuit of the north and the Inuit of the south.

1800s: Intermarriage between the Inuit and Europeans

In 1810, an Englishman named William Phippard married an Inuk woman named "Sarah" and they had a son. Some other English fishermen started marrying Inuit woman as well during this time. They were later joined by large numbers of fishermen from Conception Bay and Trinity Bay (who were mostly of English and Irish descent). Most Inuit in southern Labrador received European surnames through intermarriage with Europeans. However, some Inuit surnames were anglicised such as "Paulo", "Kippenhuck", "Shuglo", "Tuccolk", "Elishoc", "Alliswack", "Penneyhook", and "Maggo" ("Kippenhuck" and "Toomashie" are the only remaining Inuit surnames (excluding names of people that have moved to NunatuKavut from other places). In 1824, it was recorded that the population around Lake Melville consisted of 160 Inuit, 90 European settlers and 60 "half-breeds" (people of European and Inuit descent). Of marriages recorded between 1773 and 1891 in southern and central Labrador, it was shown that 152 married people were Inuit, 27 were European, 14 were mixed and 1 was Mi'kmaq while the ethnic origin of 26 people could not be identified.

The racial composition of southern Labrador during the 1800s was a mix of the Inuit and English settlers while the north remained Inuit dominant. The culture of southern Labrador was (and remains) a unique blend of Newfoundland's Celtic-influenced culture and the native Inuit culture.

Newfoundland exerted significantly more control over Labrador than Canada did over its northern regions. The Newfoundland Ranger Force enforced colonial laws in Labrador like it also did in rural Newfoundland.

Post-confederation

In 1946, the Dominion of Newfoundland conducted an election to choose delegates for the Newfoundland National Convention. This was the first time that an election was held in Labrador and Lester Burry of Bonavista Bay was elected to represent Labrador. Burry wanted the Dominion of Newfoundland to become a province of Canada and in 1949, Newfoundland became Canada's 10th province.

Before confederation, most Inuit lived in small settlements of a few families in isolated harbours and on islands off the coast of Labrador. During the 1950s and 1960s many communities across the province were resettled to larger population centres as part of a provincial government-sponsored program. The collapse of the Atlantic northwest cod fishery also had a huge impact on NunatuKavut like it had on the province as a whole and many people left the province to find work elsewhere.

In 1996, the then-Labrador Metis Association vigorously protested the KGY Group's proposed Eagle River fishing camp. The issue came up as a result of a decision by the provincial government in 1996 to call for proposals for the development of a quality sports fishing camp on the Eagle River in Labrador. Corner Brook based KGY Group (a non-aboriginal application) was selected over a Labrador company. The Labrador Metis Association claimed Eagle River as a traditional salmon fishing area of NunatuKavut. For about nine days in 1996, hundreds of residents from Cartwright and nearby communities in the Sandwich Bay area kept a supply vessel and helicopter from delivering materials to the construction site. A joint RCMP and Coast Guard operation arrested at least 47 residents involved in the protests and charged most of them with mischief. In June 1999 the Crown entered a stay of proceedings on all charges laid against members of the Labrador Metis Nation during the Eagle River protests.

In 2002, a gravel road opened between Red Bay and Cartwright. This road was later extended to reach Happy Valley-Goose Bay. If NunatuKavut was recognized as one of Canada's Inuit regions by the Inuit Tapiriit Kanatami, then it would be the only one with a highway network reaching most of its communities (the towns of Inuvik and Tuktoyaktuk are connected by road to the rest of Canada via the Yukon, and are the only recognized Inuit communities that are accessible by road).

In the mid-2010s, Labrador Inuit-Metis began calling themselves the Southern Inuit of NunatuKavut.

NunatuKavut claims to represent 6,000 Inuit covering a third of Labrador's landmass. It is more densely populated than Nunatsiavut or any other Inuit region. Many residents of anglophone communities in northeastern Quebec (between the Natashquan River and the Strait of Belle Isle, sometimes called the "forgotten Labrador") claim a similar Inuit and European heritage as the people of NunatuKavut.

Lower Churchill Project
The NunatuKavut have been vocal in their opposition to the Muskrat Falls hydroelectric project.

Flag
In 2016, the NunatuKavut Community Council unveiled a proposal for its flag. The flag was designed by Barry Pardy of Cartwright.

Communities

Black Tickle-Domino
Cartwright
Charlottetown
Lodge Bay
Mary's Harbour
Norman's Bay
Paradise River
Pinsent's Arm
Port Hope Simpson
St. Lewis
William's Harbour

Land claim 

In the mid 1980s, the Labrador Metis Association was created by the inhabitants of Labrador's southern coast to gain recognition as a distinct ethnocultural group, as at the time the "Inuit-Metis" were considered to be merely the descendants of Inuit who had joined Western society. Little was known about the history of the "Inuit-Metis" of the time. In 2006, the Labrador Metis Association initiated a project with Memorial University of Newfoundland to better understand their past through the Community-University Research Association (CURA). Following research by CURA, the "Labrador Metis" were understood to be a continuation of the Inuit of southern Labrador.

In 2010, the Labrador Metis Association changed its name to reflect their newly discovered heritage, and became the NunatuKavut Community Council. In an effort to enforce the treaty of 1765, NunatuKavut launched a land claim with the federal government that is currently being negotiated. As a part of this land claim, the NunatuKavut Community Council asserts that the Muskrat Falls and Lower Churchill hydroelectric project fall on their territory. The Lower Churchill hydroelectric project injunction was rejected in 2019 by the Newfoundland supreme court.

Criticism
The legitimacy of the territory as claimed by NunatuKavut has been disputed by several Inuit and First Nations groups. Nunatsiavut does not consider NunatuKavut an indigenous collective while the Innu Nation considers NunatuKavut a "settler organization". The Inuit Tapiriit Kanatami officially rejects NunatuKavut as an Indigenous organization.

A memorandum of understanding between the NCC and the Canadian government was challenged by both the Innu Nation and Nunatsiavut. The Innu Nation does not consider the inhabitants of NunatuKavut to be Indigenous under the provisions of Section 35 of the Constitution Act. The Innu Nation's claim lands additionally significantly overlap with the lands claimed to be under NunatuKavut. The grand chief of the Innu Nation Gregory Rich was critical of the memorandum of understanding, stating that the land claim "is basically the land and the rights of the Innu people." Negotiator and former MP Peter Penashue was critical of the NCC, stating: "There has never been a group that sprung out of nowhere, that suddenly became an Aboriginal group, now here we are in a very unusual circumstance: settlers becoming Métis, becoming Inuit and now are going to fight us over land." The Innu have been additionally critical of the presence of MP Yvonne Jones, a member of the NCC, describing it as a "conflict of interest". Todd Russell described the Innu Nation's court action as a form of lateral violence.

President of the Inuit Tapiriit Kanatami Natan Obed was critical of the NunatuKavut's recognition by the federal government, considering the organization to have fraudulent claims of Indigenous identity. Obed expressed his concerns that further recognition of NunatuKavut would weaken the negotiating authority of Inuit groups. Stating that the potential for the group to receive rights and territory was perplexing "on the basis of assertions that appear unfounded." In addition, stating that "an Inuit territory outside of the four regions that constitute Inuit Nunangat does not exist." Former MP for Nunavut Mumilaaq Qaqqaq was critical of the Inuit heritage of NCC member and MP Yvonne Jones, tweeting "Jones is not an Inuk", stating further "Until you can tell me who your family is, and where you come from — and how you're Inuk, and validate your Inukness — you have no space to say you're Inuk. Stop saying you're Inuk." Qaqqaq reiterated the positions shared by the ITK, Nunatsiavut, and the Innu Nation in disputing NunatuKavut's claim to Indigenous identity. Qaqqaq would later apologize for the comments made towards Jones.

See also
Nunatsiavut
Nunavik
Nunavut

Further reading
Canadian Government: NunatuKavut Land Claim Document
NunatuKavut Community Council Inc.
 Labrador Inuit History
 Canadian Encyclopedia; Inuit presence in southern Labrador
 Royal Commission White Paper on Renewing and Strengthening Our Place in Canada

References

External links
Proposed flag of NunatuKavut

Inuit groups
Inuit in Newfoundland and Labrador
Inuit territories
Labrador
Métis in Canada
Indigenous peoples in Newfoundland and Labrador